The Crusades is an American comic book series published by the Vertigo imprint of DC Comics. It was created by writer Steven T. Seagle and artist Kelley Jones.

Publication history
The series comprises a one-shot special entitled The Crusades: Urban Decree (which introduced the characters and premise) and an ongoing series, simply titled The Crusades which ran in comics cover dated between June 2001 and December 2002.

Plot
The series was set in a fictionalised San Francisco and featured a large cast of characters whose lives are thrown into disarray by the sudden appearance of a murderous 11th Century knight in the city. Main Characters included Anton Marx, a leftwing political radio "shock jock", his fact checker girlfriend Venus Kostopikas, her friend Detective Addas Petronas and the rival gangsters Tony Quetone and "the Pope".

Collected editions
Image Comics is releasing the series in two hardcovers:
 Volume 1: The Knight (256 pages, Image Comics, August 2010) reprinting The Crusades: Urban Decree and The Crusades #1–9
 Volume 2: Dei (256 Pages, Image Comics, February 2011) reprinting The Crusades #10-20

Notes

References

2001 comics debuts
2002 comics endings
Crime comics
Comics set in the United States
Comics set in the Middle Ages
Comics set in the 11th century
Comics set in the 21st century
Comics about time travel
Crusades